Alla Levashova  (22 March 1918 – 3 March 1974) was a Russian fashion designer.

Biography
Alla Levashova was born in Moscow on 22 March 1918.  She graduated from the  Moscow Textile Institute in 1941. She later played an important role in establishing the department of fashion designers at this institute.
After completing her education, she joined at the Stanislavsky Moscow Opera and Drama Studio as a production designer. Later she moved to All-Union Model House, where she began a new career in fashion designing. 

In 1966 she became director for the newly created Special Designing Bureau (SKhKB) in the Ministry of Light Industry.  She established contact with number of popular fashion design houses in other countries including Christian Dior, and led the official Soviet delegation on visits.In Paris, she personally met the popular French designer Yves Saint Laurent, who was the artistic director of Christian Dior.

In her writings, she advocated the need for creating “clothes for everyone,” and emphasised on the importance of designing clothes for “broad masses.” Under her leadership, the Special Designing Bureau facilitated the production of  garments that were 
“inexpensive and accessible to ordinary people.”

Her fashion designing models reflected the combination of “elegance and simplicity.” She also actively promoted the “idea of central control of Soviet fashion industry” in which the local industries at different locations adopted the mass design solutions developed by an office at the federal level. 

She is being considered as “one of the Soviet Union’s leading fashion designers.”

She died in Moscow on 3 March 1974.

References

 1918 births
 1974 deaths
 
Design occupations